The Grand Escapade is a 1946 British family adventure film directed by John Baxter and starring The Artemus Boys, James Harcourt, Patric Curwen and Peter Bull.

Plot
Three boys join an old traveller on his journey through Southern England, eventually helping to expose and capture some smugglers.

Cast
 The Artemus Boys - Themselves
 James Harcourt - Old Traveller
 Patric Curwen - Author
 Peter Bull - Jennings
 Edgar Driver - Night Watchman
 Ernest Sefton - Simon Archer
 Ben Williams - Jack Barrow
 Howard Douglas - Mark Han
 Ivor Barnard - Fisherman
 Charles Rolfe - First Farmhand
 Arthur Denton - Second Farmhand

References

External links

1946 films
1946 adventure films
1940s English-language films
Films directed by John Baxter
British black-and-white films
British adventure films
1940s British films